Bernard James Sheil (February 18, 1888 – September 13, 1969) was an Auxiliary Roman Catholic Bishop of Chicago.

Biography
Born and raised in Chicago, Sheil was ordained a priest on May 3, 1910.  He was named auxiliary Bishop of Chicago in 1928, a post he held for over forty years.  As bishop he was given the titular see of Pegae.  On June 5, 1959, he was raised to the rank of Archbishop, being named titular Archbishop of Selge.

Sheil was "outspoken advocate of social justice in the underprivileged and marginalized sectors of the community." His pro-labor stance led him to endorse some controversial strikes.

Bishop Sheil was founder of Catholic Youth Organization (CYO). According to a history of Catholic Scouting, while Cardinal Mundelein of Chicago had "explored the possibility of Scouting for his 'street kiddies,' it was not until his newly consecrated auxiliary, Bishop Bernard J. Sheil, took the reins, that Catholic Scouting flourished in Chicago." He was awarded the Silver Buffalo Award by the Boy Scouts of America in 1942.

The Sheil School of Social Studies, which focused on adult education, opened at CYO headquarters in 1943. In eleven years of operation, it enrolled 20,000 students. In 1954, Sheil vehemently attacked Joseph McCarthy, at a time when most Catholics supported this right-wing senator, provoking the withdrawal of some of the financial supporters of his projects. The Sheil Catholic Center at Northwestern University is also named for him.

See also

 Roman Catholic Church
 Roman Catholic Archdiocese of Chicago

References

Defeat in Chicago

External links
The Silver Buffalo Award
No Nonsense Archbishop from Time
Defeat in Chicago from Time

20th-century American Roman Catholic titular bishops
Clergy from Chicago
McCarthyism
1969 deaths
Commanders Crosses of the Order of Merit of the Federal Republic of Germany
1888 births
Roman Catholic Archdiocese of Chicago
Religious leaders from Illinois
Catholics from Illinois